Le Rime (The Rhymes) are a group of lyric poems by Dante Alighieri written throughout his life and based on the poet's varied existential and stylistic experiences.  They were not designed as a collection by Dante himself, but were collected and ordered later by modern critics.

A subsection of the collection is a group of four poems known as the Rime Petrose, love poems dedicated to a woman called Petra, composed around 1296. Stylistically those poems are regarded as a transition between the love lyric of La Vita Nuova and the more sacred subject matter of the Divine Comedy.

References

External links

 

Medieval poetry
14th-century books
Medieval Italian literature
Works by Dante Alighieri

de:Dante Alighieri#Rime